Peter Qasim was the longest-serving detainee in Australian immigration detention, having been detained there for over seven years. He had not been deported because he was stateless. He was detained at Baxter Immigration Reception and Processing Centre before being transferred to an Adelaide psychiatric facility.

He had applied to over 80 countries for asylum, but had not been accepted.  This includes India, which claims sovereignty over Kashmir, from where Qasim originates.

Detention in Australia
In personal accounts Qasim described escaping from his home village of Gopalla in India, into Pakistan, then through Singapore and Papua New Guinea onto Australia. Qasim's provenance, however, proved difficult to verify due to a lack of supporting documentation or witnesses. This lack of evidence, and numerous unsuccessful attempts to validate Qasim's story were primarily responsible for his prolonged period of detention.

His case has been publicised by the well-known Australian entrepreneur Dick Smith. Australian authorities have maintained that he has not proven his nationality. He was invited to apply for a new visa on 20 June 2005. In 2005, Qasim was 31 years old, and was held at Baxter Detention Centre until, on 9 June 2005, he was moved to a psychiatric hospital.  He received treatment for depression.

Release
On 16 July 2005 Qasim was granted a bridging visa by the Australian government.  The visa granted permission to work and to receive welfare benefits.  He spent a total of six years and 10 months in detention.

He is still holding a bridging visa as of September 2013.

See also

Cornelia Rau

References

Stateless people
Living people
Australian people of Kashmiri descent
Australian Muslims
Indian emigrants to Australia
1974 births
People from Jammu and Kashmir
People from Rajouri district